Gips or GIPS may refer to:

People 
 Archie Gips, American filmmaker
 Dirk Boest Gips (1864–1920), Dutch sport shooter
 Donald Gips (born 1960), American diplomat
 James Gips (died 2018), American academic

Other uses 
 "Gips" (song), by Ringo Sheena, 2000
 Billion instructions per second
 Global Investment Performance Standards, a set of standards defined for the Certificate in Investment Performance Measurement
 Global IP Solutions, an American corporation
 Grand Island Public Schools, an American public school district

See also 

 GIP (disambiguation)
 Gipps (disambiguation)